The Griffin Street Cemetery is an historic cemetery in New Bedford, Massachusetts. Located at the junction of South 2nd and Griffin Streets, and abutting JFK Memorial Highway to the east, it is the city's oldest surviving cemetery. It was established in 1804, not far from a Quaker cemetery whose remains were later reinterred in the city's Rural Cemetery. The cemetery has about 230 grave stones, but it is suspected that a significant number of graves are unmarked. The oldest grave dates to 1804, the newest to 1855.

The cemetery was listed on the National Register of Historic Places in 2014.

See also
 National Register of Historic Places listings in New Bedford, Massachusetts

References

External links
 

Cemeteries on the National Register of Historic Places in Massachusetts
Cemeteries in Bristol County, Massachusetts
Buildings and structures in New Bedford, Massachusetts
National Register of Historic Places in New Bedford, Massachusetts
Cemeteries established in the 1800s
1804 establishments in Massachusetts